Sheen T. Kassouf (11 August 1928 – 10 August 2005) was an economist from New York known for research in financial mathematics. In 1957 he married Gloria Daher in Brooklyn, New York. Kassouf received a PhD in economics from Columbia University (1965) and was later professor of economics at University of California Irvine. Together with Edward O. Thorp he co-authored the book Beat the Market in 1967.

Publications 
 Kassouf, S. T. ; Thorp, E. O., Beat the Market: A Scientific Stock Market System, 
 Access to all published works - UCI Department of Economics

References

External links 
Sheen Kassouf Page - UCI Department of Economics

1928 births
2005 deaths
Economists from California
Financial economists
Columbia Graduate School of Arts and Sciences alumni
University of California, Irvine faculty
American economics writers
American male non-fiction writers
20th-century American economists
20th-century American male writers